"Pretty Ballerina" is a song written by pianist Michael Brown that was released as a single by his band the Left Banke in December 1966. It peaked at number 15 on the Billboard Hot 100 chart and number 4 on the Canadian RPM chart. The original Left Banke version of the song was sung by Steve Martin Caro and has appeared in the films Apocalypse Now, Off Limits and Things Behind the Sun. The song has been covered by such artists as Alice Cooper, John Mellencamp, Jason Falkner, Peter Kingsbery, Eels, Argentine rock star Charly García, Alan Merrill, the Bluetones, and the Dickies.

Composition
"Pretty Ballerina" was one of the first pop songs to use the Lydian mode in its melody (more specifically the acoustic scale), predating the Beatles' Indian-inspired "Blue Jay Way" and Donovan's "Peregrine". The recording features an oboe over the instrumental portion of the track, joining the string quartet, before the music pauses, and goes back to the refrain of the song.

It is one of several songs that Brown wrote about Renee Fladen, the girlfriend of Left Banke guitarist Tom Finn and the object of Brown's affections. Other songs written about her include the band's biggest hit, "Walk Away Renée", and "She May Call You Up Tonight".

Chart performance

Weekly charts

Year-end charts

References

External links
LeftBanke.nu
DJ Tom Finn
Alice Cooper
 

1966 singles
Eels (band) songs
Songs written by Michael Brown (rock musician)
The Left Banke songs
1966 songs
Smash Records singles
Songs about dancing
Philips Records singles